These page shows the results for the 62nd edition of the Gent–Wevelgem cycling classic over 208 kilometres, held on Wednesday April 5, 2000. There were 194 competitors, of whom 47 finished the race which was won by Belgium's Geert Van Bondt.

Final classification

References

External links
Official race website

Gent–Wevelgem
2000 in road cycling
2000 in Belgian sport
April 2000 sports events in Europe